Agonum excavatum is a species of ground beetle from Platyninae subfamily that can be found in Suffolk County, Massachusetts.

References

External links
Agonum excavatum on Bug Guide

Beetles described in 1828
Beetles of North America
excavatum
Endemic fauna of the United States